In Inca mythology, Unu Pachakuti is the name of a flood that Viracocha caused to destroy the people around Lake Titicaca, saving two to bring civilization to the rest of the world. 

The process of destruction is linked with a new construction. It has a very deep meaning in the language and traditions. Some people would translate it as "revolution".

"The Inca’s supreme being and creator god, Con Tici (Kon Tiki) Viracocha, first created a race of giants, but they were unruly, so he destroyed them in a mighty flood and turned them to stone. Following the deluge, he created human beings from smaller stones.
"In other versions of this story, the impious race is the pre-Inca civilization of the Tiahuanaco Americans about Lake Titicaca, the large high lake in the Andes. Viracocha drowns them and spares two, a man and a woman, to start the human race anew.
Some versions of the Unu Pachakuti have the surviving man and woman floating to Lake Titicaca in a wooden box."

See also
Flood
Flood myth
Inca mythology
Pachakutic
Viracocha

References

Inca mythology
Flood myths